Taulelehemaama Salilo Tongia is a Niuean politician.

Tongia was first elected to the Niue Assembly in the 2011 election, ousting Tofua Puletama from Makefu in a close result. The result was unsuccessfully challenged in an election petition.

References

Members of the Niue Assembly
Living people
Niuean women in politics
21st-century New Zealand women politicians
21st-century New Zealand politicians
Year of birth missing (living people)